Teška Industrija (trans. "Heavy Industry") is a rock band from Bosnia and Herzegovina, based in Sarajevo. They are noted for a mixture of hard rock and prog-rock sound with elements of bosnian folk music and "symphonic" arrangements. Teška Industrija have had many line-up changes, disbanding in 1978 and re-forming again in 2007 after several unsuccessful attempts.

History
The band was officially formed in 1974 in Sarajevo by keyboard player Gabor Lenđel who assembled a line-up with Ivica Propadalo (bass), Vedad Hadžiabdić (guitar) and the vocalist Fadil Toskić, while the poet Duško Trifunović wrote most of the early lyrics. After a modest start, Seid Memić Vajta joined as the vocalist and, in september 1975, the bassist Sanin Karić. This lineup published the first two singles, "Karavan" and "Kolika je Jahorina planina", the latter a version of the popular folk song. A year later, their debut album Ho ruk was published. They attracted attention at the 1976 Split Festival with a light-hearted song "Život je maskenbal". After that, Seid Memić Vajta and Sanin Karić left the band.

By the end of 1976, Teška Industrija was joined by the vocalist Goran Kovačević, bassist Aleksandar Kostić, drummer Munib Zoranić and keyboard player Darko Arkus, and published the second, eponymous album. The album was successful, but evoked a scandal when it became clear that the band used the music of the Hungarian band Skorpion for the song "Ala imam ružnu curu" without attribution. Lenđel was conscripted in 1977 and had to leave Teška Industrija. The remaining members published the album Zasviraj i za pojas zadjeni in 1976, which was unsuccessful, and Teška Industrija disbanded.

In 1984, Hadžiabdić and Zoranić tried unsuccessfully to reestablish the band with new musicians (vocalist Narcis Lalić, bassist Sead Trnka, and keyboard player Zoran Krga), but their album Ponovo sa vama did not chart. Hadžiabdić tried again a decade later with another new lineup, and published the album Ruže u asfaltu (1996) under the name Teška Industrija, but the more pop-oriented album again failed to attract interest. Finally, Lenđel and Propadalo spearheaded a more successful attempt in 2007, together with drummer Robert Domitrović and keyboard player Zrinka Majstorović, with whom they published the album Kantina. This was followed by Nazovi album pravim imenom (2010) and Bili smo raja (2011), the latter becoming one of the best selling pop-rock albums of the year in Croatia. Teška Industrija have been mostly touring Croatia since then. In 2013, the anthology album XL nakon! was published to commemorate the band's 40th anniversary.

Discography
 Ho ruk (Jugoton, 1976)
 Teška industrija (Jugoton, 1976)
 Zasviraj i za pojas zadjeni (Jugoton, 1978)
 Teška industrija i S.M. Vajta (Jugoton, 1981); compilation
 Ponovo sa vama (Sarajevo Disk, 1984)
 Ruže u asfaltu (Art of Voice - Megaton, 1996)
 Karavan - Izvorne snimke 1975/1976 (2002); compilation
 Kantina (Croatia Records, 2007)
 Nazovi album pravim imenom (Hit Records, 2010)
 Bili smo raja (Croatia Records, 2011)
 XL nakon! (Croatia Records, 2013); compilation

Members

 Vedad Hadžiavdić - guitar
 Robert Domitrović - drums
 Lea Mijatović - lead vocals
 Ivica Propadalo - bass
 Fran Šokić - keyboards

References

External links

Bosnia and Herzegovina progressive rock groups
Yugoslav progressive rock groups
Yugoslav hard rock musical groups
Musical groups established in 1974
Musical groups disestablished in 1978
Musical groups reestablished in 2007